Ulopeza is a genus of moths of the family Crambidae. It was described by Philipp Christoph Zeller in 1852.

Species
Ulopeza alenialis Strand, 1913
Ulopeza conigeralis Zeller, 1852
Ulopeza crocifrontalis Mabille, 1900
Ulopeza crocochalca (Meyrick, 1933)
Ulopeza cruciferalis Kenrick, 1907
Ulopeza denticulalis Hampson, 1912
Ulopeza disjunctalis Hampson, 1918
Ulopeza flavicepsalis Hampson, 1912
Ulopeza fuscomarginalis (Ghesquière, 1940)
Ulopeza idyalis (Walker, 1859)
Ulopeza innotalis Karsch, 1900
Ulopeza junctilinealis Hampson, 1912
Ulopeza macilentalis Viette, 1958
Ulopeza nigricostata Hampson, 1912
Ulopeza primalis Viette, 1958
Ulopeza sterictodes Hampson, 1912

Former species
Ulopeza cyphoplaca (Meyrick, 1933)
Ulopeza panaresalis (Walker, 1859)
Ulopeza pseudohesusalis (Strand, 1920)
Ulopeza trigonalis (Mabille, 1890)

References

Spilomelinae
Crambidae genera
Taxa named by Philipp Christoph Zeller